Cowboy is a 2011 film directed by Juan Minujín, written by Facundo Agrelo and Juan Minujín and starring Juan Minujín, Guillermo Arengo and Daniel Fanego. The film premiered at the 2011 Zurich Film Festival and was released on September 29, 2011.

Cast 
 Juan Minujín as Julián
 Guillermo Arengo
 Daniel Fanego
 Pilar Gamboa
 Brad Krupsaw as Vince
 Esteban Lamothe
 Marcelo Melingo
 Esmeralda Mitre
 Sergio Pangaro
 Leonardo Sbaraglia as Alonso
 Alberto Suárez
 Julieta Vallina

References

External links
 

2011 films
2010s Argentine films